John Demmy (March 5, 1904 – March 1970) was an American football player. He played two years in the National Football League (NFL) as a tackle for the Staten Island Stapletons during the 1930 and 1931 seasons. He appeared in nine NFL games, three as a starter.

References

1904 births
1970 deaths
Staten Island Stapletons players
Players of American football from New Jersey
Sportspeople from Bayonne, New Jersey